Vegetation Island is a narrow island lying 2 nautical miles (3.7 km) north of Inexpressible Island and just west of the Northern Foothills, along the coast of Victoria Land. It was discovered by the Northern Party of the British Antarctic Expedition, 1910–13, who named it because the rocks were densely covered with lichens.

See also
 List of antarctic and sub-antarctic islands

Islands of Victoria Land
Scott Coast